"Romeo and Juliet" is a 1967 Australian TV play based on the play by William Shakespeare. It was presented as part of the Love and War anthology series on the ABC.

Premise
In the Italian town of Verona, Romeo and Juliet are teenagers from feuding families who fall in love.

Cast
Sean Scully as Romeo
Liza Goddard as Juliet
Syd Conabere as Friar Laurence
Robin Ramsay as Mercutio
David Turnbull as Tybalt
Jennifer Claire
Joseph James
Joan Harris as nurse

Production
It was the first Australian TV presentation of the play and featured a cast of over fifty. "Using young actors makes the story more acceptable," said director Oscar Whitbread. "The basic thing with teenagers is that they tend to become isolated from their parents and society when they fall in love. But do we, as adults, understand the purity of their love?"

It was filmed in Melbourne. The production was announced in July and rehearsals began in September.  The adaptation was by Alan Cole of Melbourne University. Whitbread claimed that "Alan Cole has adapted it beautifully."

Reception
The Age called it "a really splendid achievement."

The Sydney Morning Herald said the production "will not need to be kept for generations ungotten and unborn...listening was like reading with every line spaced out. Sean Scully and Liza Goddard were looking as though they wanted to play it in jeans... The production lacked creative direction."

References

1960s Australian television plays
Films based on Romeo and Juliet